Henri-Gustave Casadesus (30 September 1879, Paris – 31 May 1947, Paris) was a violist, viola d'amore player, composer, and music publisher.

Early life
Casadesus received his early musical instruction with Albert Lavignac and studied viola with Théophile Laforge at the Conservatoire de Paris, taking first prize in 1899. From 1910 to 1917, he was the violist of the Capet Quartet.

Career
Along with Camille Saint-Saëns, Casadesus founded the "Société des instruments anciens" in 1901. The society, which operated between 1901 and 1939, was a quintet of performers who used obsolete instruments such as the viola da gamba, or Casadesus's own instrument, the viola d'amore.

The quintet was also notable in its day for premiering rediscovered works by long-dead composers. It was later discovered that Casadesus and his brothers, notably Marius Casadesus, wrote these works. The Adélaïde Concerto, allegedly by Wolfgang Amadeus Mozart, is sometimes mistakenly attributed to Henri but is actually by Marius.

However, Casadesus is believed to have been the author of a "Concerto in D Major for viola" ascribed to Carl Philipp Emanuel Bach, described by Rachel W. Wade in her survey The Keyboard Concertos of Carl Philipp Emanuel Bach. This concerto appeared in 1911 in a Russian edition, allegedly "transcribed...for small orchestra by Maximilian Steinberg," and was subsequently performed by conductors such as Darius Milhaud and Serge Koussevitsky, then recorded by both Felix Prohaska and Eugene Ormandy, all under the false attribution. "Thus," Wade wrote in 1981, "at the present time, the most frequently recorded concerto of C.P.E. Bach is a spurious one."

Casadesus is also credited with the "Handel Concerto" and the "J.C. Bach Concerto," which are both for viola as well. These are often referred to as "The Handel/Casadesus Concerto" and "The J.C. Bach/Casadesus Concerto". Scholarly criticism has confirmed that both these concerti were written by Henri Casadesus in the style of their purported composers. Casadesus is also the composer of a violin concerto in D major in the style of Boccherini.

Family
He was the brother of Marius Casadesus and Robert-Guillaume Casadesus, uncle of the famous pianist Robert Casadesus, and granduncle of Jean Casadesus. Henri Casadesus had five children including actor Christian Casadesus and actress Gisèle Casadesus. He was grandfather to Jean-Claude Casadesus and Dominique Probst.

Selected works
Stage
 Le rosier, Opera buffa in 3 acts (1914); libretto by Maurice Devilliers
 Les plaisirs champêtres, ou, Les tentations de las bergère et l'amour vainqueur, Ballet in 1 act (1924); music derived from Plaisirs champêtres and Divertissement by Michel Pignolet de Montéclair
 Cotillon III, Opera buffa in 3 acts (1927); libretto by Gabriel Alphaud and Pierre Maudru
 Sans tambour ni trompette, Operetta in 3 acts, 4 scenes (1931); libretto by Pierre Veber and Henry de Gorsse
 La petite-fille de madame Angot, Operetta

Orchestral
 Concerto in D major for small orchestra (ca.1905, published 1912); original "for four viols concertante"; falsely attributed to Carl Philipp Emanuel Bach
 Divertissement bressan, Suite for orchestra (published 1943)
 Divertissement Provençal, Suite for orchestra (published 1943)
     Cortège et danse des treilles
     L'Erbeto di frisoun
     Le pas du cap de juven
     Tambourin

Concertante
 Concerto (Suite) in D major for violin or viola and piano or orchestra (ca.1905, published 1931); original "for four viols concertante"; falsely attributed to Carl Philipp Emanuel Bach
 "Handel" Concerto in B minor for viola and orchestra (published 1924); falsely attributed to George Frideric Handel
 "J.C. Bach" Concerto in C minor for viola and orchestra (published 1947); falsely attributed to Johann Christian Bach

Chamber music
 Aria de la Suite en sol, for cello and piano (or organ) (1911)
 Suite for string quartet (or string orchestra) (published 1931); falsely attributed to Carl Philipp Emanuel Bach
 La ronde des saisons for woodwind quintet (published 1987)
 24 préludes pour viole d'amour avec accompagnement de clavecin, piano ou harpe (24 Preludes) for viola d'amore with accompaniment of harpsichord, piano, or harp (1931)

Pedagogical works
 Technique de la viole d'amour (Technique of the Viola d'amore) (1931)

Piano
 Pieces from Cotillon-jazz (1927)
     C'est moi, One-step
     Jeux innocents, Fox-trot
     Loulou, Fox-trot
     Radix, One-step
 Marche ternaire (1935)
 Le jardin des amours (1939)
     Pavane
     Passepied
     Menuet tendre
     Canarie
 Les Récréations de la campagne (1947)

Vocal
 Quatre chansons cambodgiennes (4 Cambodian Songs) for voice and piano (1931); French words by Fernand Rouvray
 Quatre chansons françaises (4 French Songs) for voice and piano (1933); words by Léon Guillot de Saix
 Normandie for voice and piano (1935); words by René Dorin

Film scores
 Barranco, Ltd (1932)
 Colomba (1933)
 Le crime du chemin rouge (1933)
 Le gardian
 Paris New-York (1940)
 Matin de France (1942)
 Les mystères de Paris (Mysteries of Paris) (1943)

References

External links
 
 Henri Casadesus: Composer, Conductor
 

1879 births
1947 deaths
Musicians from Paris
Conservatoire de Paris alumni
French classical violists
French viola d'amore players
French film score composers
French operetta composers
French male film score composers
Musical hoaxes
Historicist composers
Henri
French male classical composers